Solomon Islands is an island country consisting of six major islands and over 900 smaller islands in Oceania, to the east of Papua New Guinea and northwest of Vanuatu. Its capital, Honiara, is located on the largest island, Guadalcanal. The country takes its name from the wider area of the Solomon Islands (archipelago), which is a collection of Melanesian islands that also includes the Autonomous Region of Bougainville (currently a part of Papua New Guinea), but excludes the Santa Cruz Islands.

The islands have been settled since at least some time between 30,000 and 28,800 BCE, with later waves of migrants, notably the Lapita people, mixing and producing the modern indigenous Solomon Islanders population. In 1568, the Spanish navigator Álvaro de Mendaña was the first European to visit them. Though not named by Mendaña, it is believed that the islands were called "the Solomons" by those who later received word of his voyage and mapped his discovery. Mendaña returned decades later, in 1595, and another Spanish expedition, led by Portuguese navigator Pedro Fernandes de Queirós, visited the Solomons in 1606. During World War II, the Solomon Islands campaign (1942–1945) saw fierce fighting between the United States, British Commonwealth forces and the Empire of Japan, including the Battle of Guadalcanal.

The official name of the then-British administration was changed from the "British Solomon Islands Protectorate" to "The Solomon Islands" in 1975, and self-government was achieved the following year. Independence was obtained, and the name changed to just "Solomon Islands" (without the definite article), in 1978. At independence, Solomon Islands became a constitutional monarchy. The King of Solomon Islands is Charles III, who is represented in the country by a governor-general.

Name
In 1568, the Spanish navigator Álvaro de Mendaña was the first European to visit the Solomon Islands archipelago but did not name the archipelago at that time, only certain individual islands. Though not named by Mendaña, the islands were subsequently referred to as Islas Salomón (Solomon Islands) by others following reports of his voyage optimistically conflated with stories of the wealthy biblical King Solomon, believing them to be the Bible-mentioned city of Ophir. During most of the colonial period, the territory's official name was the "British Solomon Islands Protectorate" until independence in 1978, when it was changed to "Solomon Islands" as defined in the Constitution of Solomon Islands and as a Commonwealth realm under this name. The definite article, "the", is not part of the country's official name but remains for all references to the area pre-independence and is sometimes used, both within and outside the country. Colloquially the islands are referred to simply as "the Solomons".

History

Prehistory

The Solomons were first settled by people coming from the Bismarck Islands and New Guinea during the Pleistocene era c. 30,000–28,000 BCE, based on archaeological evidence found at Kilu Cave on Buka Island in the Autonomous Region of Bougainville, Papua New Guinea. At this point sea levels were lower and Buka and Bougainville were physically joined to the southern Solomons in one landmass ("Greater Bougainville"), though it is unclear precisely how far south these early settlers spread as no other archaeological sites from this period have been found. As sea levels rose as the Ice Age ended c. 4000–3500 BCE, the Greater Bougainville landmass split into the numerous islands that exist today. Evidence of later human settlements dating to c. 4500–2500 BCE have been found at Poha Cave and Vatuluma Posovi Cave on Guadalcanal. The ethnic identity of these early peoples is unclear, though it is thought that the speakers of the Central Solomon languages (a self-contained language family unrelated to other languages spoken in the Solomons) likely represent the descendants of these earlier settlers.

From c. 1200–800 BCE Austronesian Lapita people began arriving from the Bismarcks with their characteristic ceramics. Evidence for their presence has been found across the Solomon archipelago, as well at the Santa Cruz Islands in the south-east, with different islands being settled at different times. Linguistic and genetic evidence suggests that the Lapita people "leap-frogged" the already inhabited main Solomon Islands and settled first on the Santa Cruz group, with later back-migrations bringing their culture to the main group. These peoples mixed with the native Solomon Islanders and over time their languages became dominant, with most of the 60–70 languages spoken there belonging to the Oceanic branch of the Austronesian language family. Then, as now, communities tended to exist in small villages practising subsistence agriculture, though extensive inter-island trade networks existed. Numerous ancient burial sites and other evidence of permanent settlements have been found from the period 1000–1500 CE throughout the islands, one of the most prominent examples being the Roviana cultural complex centred on the islands off the southern coast of New Georgia, where a large number of megalithic shrines and other structures were constructed in the 13th century. The people of Solomon Islands were notorious for headhunting and cannibalism before the arrival of the Europeans.

Arrival of Europeans (1568–1886)

The first European to visit the islands was the Spanish navigator Álvaro de Mendaña de Neira, sailing from Peru in 1568. Landing on Santa Isabel on 7 February, Mendaña explored several of the other islands including Makira, Guadalcanal and Malaita. Relations with the native Solomon Islanders were initially cordial, although they often soured as time went by. As a result, Mendaña returned to Peru in August 1568. He returned to the Solomons with a larger crew on a second voyage in 1595, aiming to colonise the islands. They landed on Nendö in the Santa Cruz Islands and established a small settlement at Gracioso Bay. However, the settlement failed due to poor relations with the native peoples and epidemics of disease amongst the Spanish which caused numerous deaths, with Mendaña himself dying in October. The new commander Pedro Fernandes de Queirós thus decided to abandon the settlement and they sailed north to the Spanish territory of the Philippines. Queirós later returned to the area in 1606, where he sighted Tikopia and Taumako, though this voyage was primarily to Vanuatu in the search of Terra Australis.

Save for Abel Tasman's sighting of the remote Ontong Java Atoll in 1648, no European sailed to the Solomons again until 1767, when the British explorer Philip Carteret sailed by the Santa Cruz Islands, Malaita and, continuing further north, Bougainville and the Bismarck Islands. French explorers also reached the Solomons, with Louis Antoine de Bougainville naming Choiseul in 1768 and Jean-François de Surville exploring the islands in 1769. In 1788 John Shortland, captaining a supply ship for Britain's new Australian colony at Botany Bay, sighted the Treasury and Shortland Islands. That same year the French explorer Jean-François de La Pérouse was wrecked on Vanikoro; a rescue expedition led by Bruni d'Entrecasteaux sailed to Vanikoro but found no trace of La Pérouse. The fate of La Pérouse was not confirmed until 1826, when the English merchant Peter Dillon visited Tikopia and discovered items belonging to La Pérouse in the possession of the local people, confirmed by the subsequent voyage of Jules Dumont d'Urville in 1828.

Some of the earliest regular foreign visitors to the islands were whaling vessels from Britain, the United States and Australia. They came for food, wood and water from late in the 18th century, establishing a trading relationship with the Solomon Islanders and later taking aboard islanders to serve as crewmen on their ships. Relations between the islanders and visiting seamen were not always good and sometimes there was bloodshed. A knock-on effect of the greater European contact was the spread of diseases to which local peoples had no immunity, as well as a shift in the balance of power between coastal groups, who had access to European weapons and technology, and inland groups who did not. In the second half of the 1800s more traders arrived seeking turtleshells, sea cucumbers, copra and sandalwood, occasionally establishing semi-permanent trading stations. However, initial attempts at more long-term settlement, such as Benjamin Boyd's colony on Guadalcanal in 1851, were unsuccessful.

Beginning in the 1840s, and accelerating in the 1860s, islanders began to be recruited (or often kidnapped) as labourers for the colonies in Australia, Fiji and Samoa in a process known as "blackbirding". Conditions for workers were often poor and exploitative, and local islanders often violently attacked any Europeans who appeared on their island. The blackbird trade was chronicled by prominent Western writers, such as Joe Melvin and Jack London. Christian missionaries also began visiting the Solomons from the 1840s, beginning with an attempt by French Catholics under Jean-Baptiste Epalle to establish a mission on Santa Isabel, which was abandoned after Epalle was killed by islanders in 1845. Anglican missionaries began arriving from the 1850s, followed by other denominations, over time gaining a large number of converts.

Colonial period (1886–1978)

Establishment of colonial rule
In 1884 Germany annexed north-east New Guinea and the Bismarck Archipelago, and in 1886 they extended their rule over the North Solomon Islands, covering Bougainville, Buka, Choiseul, Santa Isabel, the Shortlands and Ontong Java atoll. In 1886 Germany and Britain confirmed this arrangement, with the British gaining a "sphere of influence" over the southern Solomons. Germany paid little attention to the islands, with German authorities based in New Guinea not even visiting the area until 1888. The German presence, along with pressure from the missionaries to rein in the excesses of the blackbirding system, prompted the British to declare a protectorate over the southern Solomons in March 1893, initially encompassing New Georgia, Malaita, Guadalcanal, Makira, Mono Island and the central Nggela Islands. In April 1896, colonial official Charles Morris Woodford was appointed as the British Acting Deputy Commissioner and confirmed in post the following year. Woodford set up an administrative headquarters on the small island of Tulagi, and in 1898 and 1899 the Rennell and Bellona Islands, Sikaiana, the Santa Cruz Islands and outlying islands such as Anuta, Fataka, Temotu and Tikopia were added to the protectorate. In 1900, under the terms of the Tripartite Convention of 1899, Germany ceded the Northern Solomon to Britain, minus Buka and Bougainville, the latter becoming part of German New Guinea despite geographically belonging to the Solomons archipelago.

Woodford's underfunded administration struggled to maintain law and order on the remote colony. From the late 1890's until the early 1900's, there were numerous instances of European merchants and colonists being killed by islanders; the British response was to deploy Royal Navy warships to launch punitive expeditions against the villages which were responsible for the murders. The British colonial government attempted to encourage the establishment of plantations by colonists; however, by 1902, there were only about 80 European colonists residing on the islands. Attempts at economic development met with mixed results, though Levers Pacific Plantations Ltd., a subsidiary of Lever Brothers, managed to establish a profitable copra plantation industry which employed many islanders. Small scale mining and logging industries were also developed. However, the colony remained something of backwater, with education, medical and other social services being the preserve of the missionaries. Violence also continued, most notably with the murder of colonial administrator William R. Bell by Basiana of the Kwaio people on Malaita in 1927, as Bell attempted to enforce an unpopular head tax. Several Kwaio were killed in a retaliatory raid, and Basiana and his accomplices executed.

World War II

From 1942 until the end of 1943, the Solomon Islands were the scene of several major land, sea and air battles between the Allies and the Japanese Empire's armed forces. Following the Japanese attack on Pearl Harbor in 1941 war was declared between Japan and the Allied Powers, and the Japanese, seeking to protect their southern flank, invaded South-East Asia and New Guinea. In May 1942 the Japanese launched Operation Mo, occupying Tulagi and most of the western Solomon Islands, including Guadalcanal where they began work on an airstrip. The British administration had already relocated to Auki, Malaita and most of the European population had been evacuated to Australia. The Allies counter-invaded Guadalcanal in August 1942, followed by the New Georgia campaign in 1943, both of which were turning points in the Pacific War, stopping and then countering the Japanese advance. The conflict resulted in thousands of Allied, Japanese and civilian deaths, as well an immense destruction across the islands.

Coastwatchers from the Solomon Islands played a major role in providing intelligence and rescuing other Allied servicemen. U.S. Admiral William Halsey, the commander of Allied forces during the Battle for Guadalcanal, recognised the coastwatchers' contributions by stating "The coastwatchers saved Guadalcanal and Guadalcanal saved the South Pacific." In addition around 3,200 men served in the Solomon Islands Labour Corps and some 6,000 enlisted in the British Solomon Islands Protectorate Defence Force, with their exposure to the Americans leading to several social and political transformations. For example, the Americans had extensively developed Honiara, with the capital shifting there from Tulagi in 1952, and the Pijin language was heavily influenced by the communication between Americans and the Islands inhabitants.

Post-war period and the lead-up to independence
In 1943–44 the Malaita-based chief Aliki Nono'ohimae had founded the Maasina Rule movement (aka the Native Council Movement, literally "Brotherhood Rule"), and was later joined by another chief, Hoasihau. Their aims were to improve the economic well-being of native Solomon Islanders, gain greater autonomy and to act as a liaison between Islanders and the colonial administration. The movement was especially popular with ex-Labour Corp members and after the war its numbers swelled, with the movement spreading to other islands. Alarmed at the growth of the movement, the British launched "Operation De-Louse" in 1947–8 and arrested most of the Maasina leaders. Malaitans then organised a campaign of civil disobedience, prompting mass arrests. In 1950 a new Resident Commissioner, Henry Gregory-Smith, arrived and released the leaders of the movement, though the disobedience campaign continued. In 1952 new High Commissioner (later Governor) Robert Stanley met with leaders of the movement and agreed to the creation of an island council. In late 1952 Stanley formally moved the capital of the territory to Honiara. In the early 1950s the possibility of transferring sovereignty of the islands to Australia was discussed by the British and Australian governments; however, the Australians were reluctant to accept the financial burden of administering the territory and the idea was shelved.

With decolonisation sweeping the colonial world, and Britain no longer willing (or able) to bear the financial burdens of the Empire, the colonial authorities sought to prepare the Solomons for self-governance. Appointed Executive and Legislative Councils were established in 1960, with a degree of elected Solomon Islander representation introduced in 1964 and then extended in 1967. A new constitution was drawn up in 1970 which merged the two Councils into one Governing Council, though the British Governor still retained extensive powers. Discontent with this prompted the creation of a new constitution in 1974 which reduced much of the Governor's remaining powers and created the post of Chief Minister, first held by Solomon Mamaloni. Full self-government for the territory was achieved in 1976, a year after the independence of neighbouring Papua New Guinea from Australia. Meanwhile, discontent grew in the Western islands, with many fearing marginalisation in future a Honiara- or Malaita-dominated state, prompting the formation of the Western Breakaway Movement. A conference held in London in 1977 agreed that the Solomons would gain full independence the following year. Under the terms of the Solomon Islands Act 1978 the country was annexed to Her Majesty's dominions and granted independence on 7 July 1978. The first Prime Minister was Sir Peter Kenilorea of the Solomon Islands United Party (SIUP), with Elizabeth II becoming Queen of Solomon Islands, represented locally by a Governor General.

Independence era (1978–present)

Early post-independence years
Peter Kenilorea went on to win the 1980 Solomon Islands general election, serving as PM until 1981, when he was replaced by Solomon Mamaloni of the People's Alliance Party (PAP) after a no confidence vote. Mamaloni created the Central Bank and national airline, and pushed for greater autonomy for individual islands of the country. Kenilorea returned to power after winning the 1984 election, though his second term lasted only two years before he was replaced by Ezekiel Alebua following allegations of misuse of French aid money. In 1986 the Solomons helped found the Melanesian Spearhead Group, aimed at fostering cooperation and trade in the region. After winning the 1989 election Mamaloni and the PAP returned to power, with Mamaloni dominating Solomon Islands politics from the early to mid 1990s (save for the one year Premiership of Francis Billy Hilly). Mamaloni made efforts to make the Solomons a republic; however, these were unsuccessful. He also had to deal with the effects of the conflict in neighbouring Bougainville which broke out in 1988, causing many refugees to flee to the Solomons. Tensions arose with Papua New Guinea as PNG forces frequently entered Solomons territory in the pursuit of rebels. The situation calmed down and relations improved following the end of the conflict in 1998. Meanwhile, the country's financial situation continued to deteriorate, with much of the budget coming from the logging industry, often conducted at an unsustainable rate, not helped by Mamaloni's creation of a 'discretionary fund' for use by politicians, which fostered fraud and corruption. Discontent with his rule led to a split in the PAP, and Mamaloni lost the 1993 election to Billy Hilly, though Hilly was later sacked by the Governor-General after a number of defections caused him to lose his majority, allowing Mamaloni to return to power in 1994, where he remained until 1997. Excessive logging, government corruption and unsustainable levels of public spending continued to grow, and public discontent caused Mamaloni to lose the 1997 election. The new Prime Minister, Bartholomew Ulufa'alu of the Solomon Islands Liberal Party, attempted to enact economic reforms; however, his Premiership soon became engulfed in a serious ethnic conflict known as "The Tensions".

Ethnic violence (1998–2003)

Commonly referred to as the tensions or the ethnic tension, the initial civil unrest was mainly characterised by fighting between the Isatabu Freedom Movement (IFM, also known as the Guadalcanal Revolutionary Army and the Isatabu Freedom Fighters) and the Malaita Eagle Force (as well as the Marau Eagle Force). For many years people from the island of Malaita had been migrating to Honiara and Guadalcanal, attracted primarily by the greater economic opportunities available there. The large influx caused tensions with native Guadalcanal islanders (known as Guales), and in late 1998 the IFM was formed and began a campaign of intimidation and violence towards Malaitan settlers. Thousands of Malaitans subsequently fled back to Malaita or to Honiara, and in mid-1999 the Malaita Eagle Force (MEF) was established to protect Malaitans on Guadalcanal. In late 1999, after several failed attempts at brokering a peace deal, Prime Minister Bartholomew Ulufa'alu declared a four-month state of emergency, and also requested assistance from Australia and New Zealand, but his appeal was rejected. Meanwhile, law and order on Guadalcanal collapsed, with an ethnically divided police unable to assert authority and many of their weapons depots being raided by the militias; by this point the MEF controlled Honiara with the IFM controlling the rest of Guadalacanal.

In April 2003, seven Christian brothers – Brother Robin Lindsay and his companions – were killed on the Weather Coast of Guadalcanal by rebel leader, Harold Keke. Six had gone in search of their Brother Nathaniel, who it turns out had already been tortured and killed. During the tensions Nathaniel had befriended the militant group but Harold Keke accused him of being a government spy and he was beaten to death while singing hymns. They are commemorated by the church on 24 April.

On 5 June 2000 Ulufa'alu was kidnapped by the MEF who felt that, although he was a Malaitan, he was not doing enough to protect their interests. Ulufa'alu subsequently resigned in exchange for his release. Manasseh Sogavare, who had earlier been Finance Minister in Ulufa'alu's government but had subsequently joined the opposition, was elected as Prime Minister by 23–21 over the Rev. Leslie Boseto. However, Sogavare's election was immediately shrouded in controversy because six MPs (thought to be supporters of Boseto) were unable to attend parliament for the crucial vote. On 15 October 2000 the Townsville Peace Agreement was signed by the MEF, elements of the IFM, and the Solomon Islands Government. This was closely followed by the Marau Peace agreement in February 2001, signed by the Marau Eagle Force, the IFM, the Guadalcanal Provincial Government, and the Solomon Islands Government. However, a key Guale militant leader, Harold Keke, refused to sign the agreement, causing a split with the Guale groups. Subsequently, Guale signatories to the agreement led by Andrew Te'e joined with the Malaitan-dominated police to form the 'Joint Operations Force'. During the next two years the conflict moved to the remote Weathercoast region of southern Guadalcanal as the Joint Operations unsuccessfully attempted to capture Keke and his group.

By early 2001 the economy had collapsed and the government was bankrupt. New elections in December 2001 brought Allan Kemakeza into the Prime Minister's chair, with the support of his People's Alliance Party and the Association of Independent Members. Law and order deteriorated as the nature of the conflict shifted: there was continuing violence on the Weathercoast, whilst militants in Honiara increasingly turned their attention to crime, extortion and banditry. The Department of Finance would often be surrounded by armed men when funding was due to arrive. In December 2002, Finance Minister Laurie Chan resigned after being forced at gunpoint to sign a cheque made out to some of the militants. Conflict also broke out in Western Province between locals and Malaitan settlers. Renegade members of the Bougainville Revolutionary Army (BRA) were invited in as a protection force but ended up causing as much trouble as they prevented. The prevailing atmosphere of lawlessness, widespread extortion, and ineffective police prompted a formal request by the Solomon Islands Government for outside help; the request was unanimously supported in Parliament.

In July 2003, Australian and Pacific Islands police and troops arrived in Solomon Islands under the auspices of the Australian-led Regional Assistance Mission to Solomon Islands (RAMSI). A sizeable international security contingent of 2,200 police and troops, led by Australia and New Zealand, and with representatives from about 15 other Pacific nations, began arriving the next month under Operation Helpem Fren. The situation improved dramatically, with violence ending and Harold Keke surrendering to the force. Some 200 people had been killed in the conflict. Since this time some commentators have considered the country a failed state, with the nation having failed to build an inclusive national identity capable of overriding local island and ethnic loyalties. However, other academics argue that, rather than being a 'failed state', it is an unformed state: a state that never consolidated even after decades of independence. Furthermore, some scholars, such Kabutaulaka (2001) and Dinnen (2002) argue that the 'ethnic conflict' label is an oversimplification.

Post-conflict era

Kemakeza remained in office until April 2006, when he lost the 2006 Solomon Islands general election and Snyder Rini became PM. However, allegations that Rini had used bribes from Chinese businessmen to buy the votes of members of Parliament led to mass rioting in the capital Honiara, concentrated on the city's Chinatown area. A deep underlying resentment against the minority Chinese business community led to much of Chinatown in the city being destroyed. Tensions were also increased by the belief that large sums of money were being exported to China. China sent chartered aircraft to evacuate hundreds of Chinese who fled to avoid the riots. Evacuation of Australian and British citizens was on a much smaller scale. Additional Australian, New Zealand and Fijian police and troops were dispatched to try to quell the unrest. Rini eventually resigned before facing a motion of no-confidence in Parliament, and Parliament elected Manasseh Sogavare as Prime Minister.

Sogavare struggled to assert his authority and was also hostile to the Australian presence in the country; after one failed attempt, he was removed in a no confidence vote in 2007 and replaced by Derek Sikua of the Solomon Islands Liberal Party. In 2008 a Truth and Reconciliation Commission was established to examine and help heal the wounds of the 'tension' years. Sikua lost the 2010 Solomon Islands general election to Danny Philip, though after a vote of no confidence in him following allegations of corruption, Philip was ousted and replaced by Gordon Darcy Lilo. Sogavare returned to power after the 2014 election, and oversaw the withdrawal of RAMSI forces from the country in 2017. Sogavare was ousted in a no confidence vote in 2017, which saw Rick Houenipwela come to power; however, Sogavare returned to the prime ministership after winning the 2019 election, sparking rioting in Honiara. In 2019 Sogavare announced that the Solomons would be switching recognition from Taiwan to China.

In November 2021, there was mass rioting and unrest. The Solomon Islands Government requested assistance from Australia under the 2017 Bilateral Security Treaty and Australia provided a deployment of Australian Federal Police and Defence Forces.

In March 2022, the Solomon Islands signed a memorandum of understanding (MOU) on policing cooperation with China and was also reported to be in the process of concluding a security agreement with China. The agreement with China could allow an ongoing Chinese military and naval presence in the Solomons. A spokesperson for Australia's Department of Foreign Affairs and Trade said that, while "Pacific Island nations have the right to make sovereign decisions", Australia "would be concerned by any actions that destabilise the security of our region". There are similar concerns in New Zealand and the United States.
China donated a shipment of replica firearms to the Solomon Islands police for training. The Solomon Islands and China signed a security co-operation agreement in April to promote social stability and long-term peace and security in the Solomon Islands. The BBC reported that, according to a leaked draft of the agreement verified by the Australian government, Beijing could deploy forces to the Solomon Islands "to assist in maintaining social order". Prime Minister Manasseh Sogavare said the pact would not "undermine peace and harmony" in the region and was aimed at protecting the Solomon's internal security situation. China confirmed that the social-order clause had been maintained in the final agreement.

In February 2023, further protests broke out, after the Premier of Malaita Province Daniel Suidani was removed from office after a vote of no confidence from the provincial legislature.

Politics

Solomon Islands is a constitutional monarchy and has a parliamentary system of government. As King of Solomon Islands, Charles III is head of state; he is represented by the Governor-General who is chosen by the Parliament for a five-year term. There is a unicameral parliament of 50 members, elected for four-year terms. However, Parliament may be dissolved by majority vote of its members before the completion of its term.

Parliamentary representation is based on single-member constituencies. Suffrage is universal for citizens over age 21. The head of government is the Prime Minister, who is elected by Parliament and chooses the cabinet. Each ministry is headed by a cabinet member, who is assisted by a permanent secretary, a career public servant who directs the staff of the ministry.

Solomon Islands governments are characterised by weak political parties (see List of political parties in Solomon Islands) and highly unstable parliamentary coalitions. They are subject to frequent votes of no confidence, leading to frequent changes in government leadership and cabinet appointments.

Land ownership is reserved for Solomon Islanders. The law provides that resident expatriates, such as the Chinese and Kiribati, may obtain citizenship through naturalisation. Land generally is still held on a family or village basis and may be handed down from mother or father according to local custom. The islanders are reluctant to provide land for nontraditional economic undertakings, and this has resulted in continual disputes over land ownership.

No military forces are maintained by Solomon Islands although a police force of nearly 500 includes a border protection unit. The police also are responsible for fire service, disaster relief, and maritime surveillance. The police force is headed by a commissioner, appointed by the governor-general and responsible to the prime minister. On 27 December 2006, the Solomon Islands government took steps to prevent the country's Australian police chief from returning to the Pacific nation. On 12 January 2007, Australia replaced its top diplomat expelled from Solomon Islands for political interference in a conciliatory move aimed at easing a four-month dispute between the two countries.

On 13 December 2007, Prime Minister Manasseh Sogavare was toppled by a vote of no confidence in Parliament, following the defection of five ministers to the opposition. It was the first time a prime minister had lost office in this way in Solomon Islands. On 20 December, the parliament elected the opposition's candidate (and former Minister for Education) Derek Sikua as Prime Minister, in a vote of 32 to 15.

In April 2019, Manasseh Sogavare was elected as prime minister for fourth time, causing protests and demonstrations against the decision.

Judiciary

The Governor-General appoints the Chief Justice of the Supreme Court on the advice of the Prime Minister and the Leader of the Opposition. The Governor-General appoints the other justices with the advice of a judicial commission. The current Chief Justice is Sir Albert Palmer.

Since March 2014 Justice Edwin Goldsbrough has served as the President of the Court of Appeal for Solomon Islands. Justice Goldsbrough has previously served a five-year term as a Judge of the High Court of Solomon Islands (2006–2011). Justice Edwin Goldsbrough then served as the Chief Justice of the Turks and Caicos Islands.

Foreign relations

Solomon Islands is a member of the United Nations, Interpol, Commonwealth of Nations, Pacific Islands Forum, Pacific Community, International Monetary Fund, and the African, Caribbean, and Pacific (ACP) countries (Lomé Convention).

Until September 2019, it was one of the few countries to recognise the Republic of China and maintain formal diplomatic relations with it. The relationship was terminated in September 2019 by Solomon Islands, which switched recognition to the People's Republic of China (PRC). Relations with Papua New Guinea, which had become strained because of an influx of refugees from the Bougainville rebellion and attacks on the northern islands of Solomon Islands by elements pursuing Bougainvillean rebels, have been repaired. A 1998 peace accord on Bougainville removed the armed threat, and the two nations regularised border operations in a 2004 agreement. Since 2022, ties with China have been rapidly increasing, with Solomon Islands signing a security pact that allows the country to call for Chinese security forces to quell unrest.

In March 2017, at the 34th regular session of the UN Human Rights Council, Vanuatu made a joint statement on behalf of Solomon Islands and some other Pacific nations raising human rights violations in the Western New Guinea, which claimed by International Parliamentarians for West Papua (IPWP) that West Papua has been occupied by Indonesia since 1963, and requested that the UN High Commissioner for Human Rights produce a report. Indonesia rejected Vanuatu's allegations, replying that Vanuatu does not represent the people of Papua and it should "stop fantasizing" that it does. More than 100,000 Papuans have died during a 50-year Papua conflict. In September 2017, at the 72nd Session of the UN General Assembly, the Prime Ministers of Solomon Islands, Tuvalu and Vanuatu once again raised human rights abuses in Indonesian-occupied West Papua.

Military
Although the locally recruited British Solomon Islands Protectorate Defence Force was part of Allied Forces taking part in fighting in the Solomons during the Second World War, the country has not had any regular military forces since independence. The various paramilitary elements of the Royal Solomon Islands Police Force (RSIPF) were disbanded and disarmed in 2003 following the intervention of the Regional Assistance Mission to Solomon Islands (RAMSI). RAMSI had a small military detachment headed by an Australian commander with responsibilities for assisting the police element of RAMSI in internal and external security. The RSIPF still operates two Pacific class patrol boats (RSIPV Auki and RSIPV Lata), which constitute the de facto navy of Solomon Islands.

In the long term, it is anticipated that the RSIPF will resume the defence role of the country. The police force is headed by a commissioner, appointed by the Governor-General and responsible to the Minister of Police, National Security & Correctional Services.

The police budget of Solomon Islands has been strained due to a four-year civil war. Following Cyclone Zoe's strike on the islands of Tikopia and Anuta in December 2002, Australia had to provide the Solomon Islands government with 200,000 Solomon dollars ($50,000 Australian) for fuel and supplies for the patrol boat Lata to sail with relief supplies. (Part of the work of RAMSI includes assisting the Solomon Islands government to stabilise its budget.)

Administrative divisions

For local government, the country is divided into ten administrative areas, of which nine are provinces administered by elected provincial assemblies and the tenth is the capital Honiara, administered by the Honiara Town Council.

Human rights

There are human rights concerns and issues in regards to education, water, sanitation, gender equality, and domestic violence.

Homosexuality is illegal in Solomon Islands.

Geography

Solomon Islands is an island nation that lies east of Papua New Guinea and consists of six major islands and over 900 smaller islands. The major part of the nation of Solomon Islands covers many of the mountainous high islands of the Solomon Islands archipelago, which includes Choiseul, the Shortland Islands, the New Georgia Islands, Santa Isabel, the Russell Islands, the Florida Islands, Tulagi, Malaita, Maramasike, Ulawa, Owaraha (Santa Ana), Makira (San Cristobal), and the main island of Guadalcanal. Solomon Islands also includes smaller, isolated low atolls and high islands such as Sikaiana, Rennell Island, Bellona Island, the Santa Cruz Islands and tiny outliers such as Tikopia, Anuta, and Fatutaka.
Although Bougainville is the largest island in the Solomon Islands archipelago it is politically an autonomous region of Papua New Guinea and does not form part of the nation of Solomon Islands.

Climate 

June through August is the cooler period. Though seasons are not pronounced, the northwesterly winds of November through April bring more frequent rainfall and occasional squalls or cyclones. According to the WorldRiskReport 2021, the island state ranks second among the countries with the highest disaster risk worldwide.

Ecology 

The Solomon Islands archipelago is part of two distinct terrestrial ecoregions. Most of the islands are part of the Solomon Islands rain forests ecoregion, which also includes the islands of Bougainville and Buka; these forests have come under pressure from forestry activities. The Santa Cruz Islands are part of the Vanuatu rain forests ecoregion, together with the neighbouring archipelago of Vanuatu. The country had a 2019 Forest Landscape Integrity Index mean score of 7.19/10, ranking it 48th globally out of 172 countries. Soil quality ranges from extremely rich volcanic (there are volcanoes with varying degrees of activity on some of the larger islands) to relatively infertile limestone. More than 230 varieties of orchids and other tropical flowers brighten the landscape. Mammals are scarce on the islands, with the only terrestrial mammals being bats and small rodents. Birds and reptiles, however, are abundant.

The islands contain several active and dormant volcanoes. The Tinakula and Kavachi volcanoes are the most active.

On the southern side of Vangunu Island, the forests around the tiny community of Zaira are unique, providing habitat for at least three vulnerable species of animals. The 200 human inhabitants of the area have been trying to get the forests declared a protected area, so that logging and mining cannot disturb and pollute the pristine forests and coastline.

The baseline survey of marine biodiversity in the Solomon Islands that was carried out in 2004, found 474 species of corals in the Solomons as well as nine species which could be new to science. This is the second highest diversity of corals in the World, second only to the Raja Ampat Islands in eastern Indonesia.

Water and sanitation 

Scarcity of fresh water sources and lack of sanitation has been a constant challenge facing Solomon Islands. Reducing the number of those living without access to fresh water and sanitation by half was one of the 2015 Millennium Development Goals (MDGs) implemented by the United Nations through Goal 7, to ensure environmental sustainability. Though the islands generally have access to fresh water sources, it is typically only available in the state's capital of Honiara, and it is not guaranteed all year long. According to a UNICEF report, even the capital's poorest communities do not have access to adequate places to relieve their waste, and an estimated 70% Solomon Island schools have no access to safe and clean water for drinking, washing and relieving of waste. Lack of safe drinking water in school-age children results in high risks of contracting fatal diseases such as cholera and typhoid. The number of Solomon Islanders living with piped drinking water has been decreasing since 2011, while those living with non-piped water increased between 2000 and 2010. Nevertheless, one improvement is that those living with non-piped water has been decreasing consistently since 2011.

In addition, the Solomon Islands Second Rural Development Program, enacted in 2014 and active until 2020, has been working to deliver competent infrastructure and other vital services to rural areas and villages of Solomon Islands, which suffer the most from lack of safe drinking water and proper sanitation. Through improved infrastructure, services and resources, the program has also encouraged farmers and other agricultural sectors, through community-driven efforts, to connect them to the market, thus promoting economic growth. Rural villages such as Bolava, found in the Western Province of Solomon Islands, have benefited greatly from the program, with the implementation of water tanks and rain catchment and water storage systems. Not only has the improved infrastructure increased the quality of life in Solomon Islands, the services are also operated and developed by the community, thus creating a sense of communal pride and achievement among those previously living in hazardous conditions. The program is funded by various international development actors such as the World Bank, European Union, International Fund for Agricultural Development (IFAD), and the Australian and Solomon Islands governments.

Earthquakes

More than 44 aftershocks with magnitude 5.0 or greater occurred up until 22:00:00 UTC, Wednesday, 4 April 2007. A tsunami followed killing at least 52 people, destroying more than 900 homes and leaving thousands of people homeless. Land upthrust extended the shoreline of one island, Ranongga, by up to  exposing many once pristine coral reefs.

On 6 February 2013, an earthquake with magnitude of 8.0 occurred at epicentre S10.80 E165.11 in the Santa Cruz Islands followed by a tsunami up to 1.5 metres. At least nine people were killed and many houses demolished. The main quake was preceded by a sequence of earthquakes with a magnitude of up to 6.0.

Economy

Solomon Islands' per-capita GDP of $600 ranks it as a least developed country, and more than 75% of its labour force is engaged in subsistence agriculture and fishing. Most manufactured goods and petroleum products must be imported. Only 3.9% of the area of the islands are used for agriculture, and 78.1% are covered by forests making the Solomon Islands the 103rd ranked country covered by forests worldwide.

The Solomon Islands Government was insolvent by 2002. Since the RAMSI intervention in 2003, the government has recast its budget. It has consolidated and renegotiated its domestic debt and with Australian backing, is now seeking to renegotiate its foreign obligations. Principal aid donors are Australia, New Zealand, the European Union, Japan and Taiwan.

Currency

The Solomon Islands dollar (ISO 4217 code: SBD) was introduced in 1977, replacing the Australian dollar at par. Its symbol is "SI$", but the "SI" prefix may be omitted if there is no confusion with other currencies also using the dollar sign "$". It is subdivided into 100 cents. Local shell money is still important for traditional and ceremonial purposes in certain provinces and, in some remote parts of the country, for trade. Shell money was a widely used traditional currency in the Pacific Islands; in Solomon Islands, it is mostly manufactured in Malaita and Guadalcanal but can be bought elsewhere, such as the Honiara Central Market. The barter system often replaces money of any kind in remote areas.

Exports

Until 1998, when world prices for tropical timber fell steeply, timber was Solomon Islands' main export product, and, in recent years, Solomon Islands forests were dangerously overexploited. In the wake of the ethnic violence in June 2000, exports of palm oil and gold ceased while exports of timber fell.

Recently, Solomon Islands courts have re-approved the export of live dolphins for profit, most recently to Dubai, United Arab Emirates. This practice was originally stopped by the government in 2004 after international uproar over a shipment of 28 live dolphins to Mexico. The move resulted in criticism from both Australia and New Zealand as well as several conservation organisations. As of 2019, rough wood still makes up two-thirds of export.

Agriculture

In 2017 317,682 tons of coconuts were harvested making the country the 18th ranked producer of coconuts worldwide, and 24% of the exports corresponded to copra. Cocoa beans are mainly grown on the islands Guadalcanal, Makira and Malaita. In 2017 4,940 tons of cocoa beans were harvested making the Solomon Islands the 27th ranked producer of cocoa worldwide. Growth of production and export of copra and cacao, however, is hampered by old age of most coconut and cacao trees. In 2017 285,721 tons of palm oil were produced, making Solomon Islands the 24th ranked producer of palm oil worldwide.

Other important cash crops and exports include copra, cacao and palm oil.

For the local market but not for export many families grow taro (2017: 45,901 tons), rice (2017: 2,789 tons), yams (2017: 44,940 tons) and bananas (2017: 313 tons). Tobacco (2017: 118 tons) and spices (2017: 217 tons). are grown for the local market as well.

The agriculture on the Solomon Islands is hampered by a very severe lack of agricultural machines.

Mining

In 1998 gold mining began at Gold Ridge on Guadalcanal. Minerals exploration in other areas continued. The islands are rich in undeveloped mineral resources such as lead, zinc, nickel, and gold. Negotiations are underway that may lead to the eventual reopening of the Gold Ridge mine which was closed after the riots in 2006.

Fisheries

Solomon Islands' fisheries also offer prospects for export and domestic economic expansion. A Japanese joint venture, Solomon Taiyo Ltd., which operated the only fish cannery in the country, closed in mid-2000 as a result of the ethnic disturbances. Though the plant has reopened under local management, the export of tuna has not resumed.

Tourism

Tourism, particularly diving, could become an important service industry for Solomon Islands. Tourism growth, however, is hampered by lack of infrastructure and transportation limitations. In 2017 the Solomon Islands were visited by 26,000 tourists making the country one of the least frequently-visited countries of the world. The country's government hoped to increase the number of tourists up to 30,000 by the end of 2019 and up to 60,000 tourists per year by the end of 2025. In 2019 the Solomon Islands were visited by 28,900 tourists and in 2020 by 4,400.

Energy

A team of renewable energy developers working for the South Pacific Applied Geoscience Commission (SOPAC) and funded by the Renewable Energy and Energy Efficiency Partnership (REEEP), have developed a scheme that allows local communities to access renewable energy, such as solar, water and wind power, without the need to raise substantial sums of cash. Under the scheme, islanders who are unable to pay for solar lanterns in cash may pay instead in kind with crops.

Infrastructure

Flight connections 
Solomon Airlines connects Honiara to Nadi in Fiji, Port Vila in Vanuatu and Brisbane in Australia as well as to more than 20 domestic airports in each province of the country. To promote tourism Solomon Airlines introduced a weekly direct flight connection between Brisbane and Munda in 2019. Virgin Australia connects Honiara to Brisbane twice a week. Most of the domestic airports are accessible to small planes only as they have short, grass runways.

Roads 
The road system in Solomon Islands is insufficient and there are no railways. The most important roads connect Honiara to Lambi (58 km; 36 miles) in the western part of Guadalcanal and to Aola (75 km; 47 miles) in the eastern part. There are few buses and these do not circulate according to a fixed timetable. In Honiara there is no bus terminus. The most important bus stop is in front of the Central Market.

Ferries 
Most of the islands can be reached by ferry from Honiara. There is a daily connection from Honiara to Auki via Tulagi by a high speed catamaran.

Demographics

The total at the November 2019 Census was 721,455. , there were  people in Solomon Islands.

Ethnic groups 

The majority of Solomon Islanders are ethnically Melanesian (95.3%). Polynesian (3.1%) and Micronesian (1.2%) are the two other significant groups. There are a few thousand Europeans and a similar number of ethnic Chinese.

Languages 

While English is the official language, only 1–2% of the population are able to communicate fluently in English. However, an English creole, Solomons Pijin, is a de facto lingua franca of the country spoken by the majority of the population, along with local indigenous languages. Pijin is closely related to Tok Pisin spoken in Papua New Guinea.

The number of local languages listed for Solomon Islands is 74, of which 70 are living languages and 4 are extinct, according to Ethnologue, Languages of the World. Western Oceanic languages (predominantly of the Southeast Solomonic group) are spoken on the central islands. Polynesian languages are spoken on Rennell and Bellona to the south, Tikopia, Anuta and Fatutaka to the far east, Sikaiana to the north east, and Luaniua to the north (Ontong Java Atoll, also known as Lord Howe Atoll). The immigrant population from Kiribati (the i-Kiribati) speak Gilbertese.

Most of the indigenous languages are Austronesian languages. The Central Solomon languages such as Bilua, Lavukaleve,  Savosavo and Touo constitute an independent family within Papuan languages.

Religion

The religion of Solomon Islands is 92% Christian. The main Christian denominations are: Anglican 35%, Catholic 19%, the South Seas Evangelical Church 17%, the United Church 11% and Seventh-day Adventist 10%. Other Christian denominations are the Jehovah's Witnesses, the New Apostolic Church (80 churches) and the Church of Jesus Christ of Latter-day Saints.

Another 5% adhere to aboriginal beliefs. The remaining adhere to Islam or the Baháʼí Faith. According to the most recent reports, Islam in Solomon Islands is made up of approximately 350 Muslims, including members of the Ahmadiyya Muslim Community.

Health

See Health in the Solomon Islands

Education

Education in Solomon Islands is not compulsory, and only 60 percent of school-age children have access to primary education. There are kindergartens in various places, including the capital, but they are not free.

From 1990 to 1994, the gross primary school enrolment rose from 84.5 percent to 96.6 percent. Primary school attendance rates were unavailable for Solomon Islands as of 2001. While enrolment rates indicate a level of commitment to education, they do not always reflect children's participation in school. The Department of Education and Human Resource Development efforts and plans to expand educational facilities and increase enrolment. However, these actions have been hindered by a lack of government funding, misguided teacher training programs, poor co-ordination of programs, and a failure of the government to pay teachers. The percentage of the government's budget allocated to education was 9.7 percent in 1998, down from 13.2 percent in 1990. Male educational attainment tends to be higher than female educational attainment.
The University of the South Pacific, which has campuses in 12 Pacific island nations, has a campus at Guadalcanal.
The literacy rate of the adult population amounted to 84.1% in 2015 (men 88.9%, women 79.23%).

The Human Rights Measurement Initiative (HRMI) finds that the Solomon Islands is fulfilling only 70.1% of what it should be fulfilling for the right to education based on the country's level of income. HRMI breaks down the right to education by looking at the rights to both primary education and secondary education. While taking into consideration the Solomon Islands' income level, the nation is achieving 94.9% of what should be possible based on its resources (income) for primary education but only 45.4% for secondary education.

Culture

The culture of Solomon Islands reflects the extent of the differentiation and diversity among the groups living within the Solomon Islands archipelago, which lies within Melanesia in the Pacific Ocean, with the peoples distinguished by island, language, topography, and geography. The cultural area includes the nation state of Solomon Islands and the Bougainville Island, which is a part of Papua New Guinea.
Solomon Islands includes some culturally Polynesian societies which lie outside the main region of Polynesian influence, known as the Polynesian Triangle. There are seven Polynesian outliers within the Solomon Islands: Anuta, Bellona, Ontong Java, Rennell, Sikaiana, Tikopia, and Vaeakau-Taumako.
Solomon Islands arts and crafts cover a wide range of woven objects, carved wood, stone and shell artefacts in styles specific to different provinces. :

Malaitan shell-money, manufactured in the Langa Langa Lagoon, is the traditional currency used in Malaita and throughout the Solomon Islands. The money consists of small polished shell disks which are drilled and placed on strings. In the Solomons Tectus niloticus is harvested, which was traditionally made into items such as pearl buttons and jewellery.

Gender inequality and domestic violence
Solomon Islands has one of the highest rates of family and sexual violence (FSV) in the world, with 64% of women aged 15–49 having reported physical and/or sexual abuse by a partner. As per a World Health Organization (WHO) report issued in 2011, "the causes of Gender Based Violence (GBV) are multiple, but it primarily stems from gender inequality and its manifestations." The report stated:
"In Solomon Islands, GBV has been largely normalized: 73% of men and 73% of women believe violence against women is justifiable, especially for infidelity and 'disobedience,' as when women do 'not live up to the gender roles that society imposes.' For example, women who believed they could occasionally refuse sex were four times more likely to experience GBV from an intimate partner. Men cited acceptability of violence and gender inequality as two main reasons for GBV, and almost all of them reported hitting their female partners as a 'form of discipline,' suggesting that women could improve the situation by '[learning] to obey [them].'"

Another manifestation and driver of gender inequality in Solomon Islands is the traditional practice of bride price. Although specific customs vary between communities, paying a bride price is considered similar to a property title, giving men ownership over women. Gender norms of masculinity tend to encourage men to "control" their wives, often through violence, while women felt that bride prices prevented them from leaving men. Another report issued by the WHO in 2013 painted a similarly grim picture.

In 2014, Solomon Islands officially launched the Family Protection Act 2014, which was aimed at curbing domestic violence in the country. While numerous other interventions are being developed and implemented in the healthcare system as well as the criminal justice system, these interventions are still in their infancy and have largely stemmed from Western protocols. Therefore, for these models to be effective, time and commitment is needed to change the cultural perception of domestic violence in Solomon Islands.

Literature

Writers from Solomon Islands include the novelists Rexford Orotaloa and John Saunana and the poet Jully Makini.

Media

Newspapers
There is one daily newspaper, the Solomon Star, one daily online news website, Solomon Times Online (www.solomontimes.com), two weekly papers, Solomons Voice and Solomon Times, and two monthly papers, Agrikalsa Nius and the Citizen's Press.

Radio
Radio is the most influential type of media in Solomon Islands due to language differences, illiteracy, and the difficulty of receiving television signals in some parts of the country. The Solomon Islands Broadcasting Corporation (SIBC) operates public radio services, including the national stations Radio Happy Isles 1037 on the dial and Wantok FM 96.3, and the provincial stations Radio Happy Lagoon and, formerly, Radio Temotu. There are two commercial FM stations, Z FM at 99.5 in Honiara but receivable over a large majority of island out from Honiara, and, PAOA FM at 97.7 in Honiara (also broadcasting on 107.5 in Auki), and, one community FM radio station, Gold Ridge FM on 88.7.

Television
No television service covers the entire Solomon Islands, but some coverage is available in six main centres in four of the nine Provinces. Satellite TV stations can be received. In Honiara, there is a free-to-air HD digital TV, analogue TV, and online service called Telekom Television Limited, operated by Solomon Telekom Co. Ltd., which rebroadcasts a number of regional and international TV services including ABC Australia and BBC World News. Residents can also subscribe to SATSOL, a digital pay TV service, re-transmitting satellite television.

Music

Traditional Melanesian music in Solomon Islands includes both group and solo vocals, slit-drum and panpipe ensembles. Bamboo music gained a following in the 1920s. In the 1950s Edwin Nanau Sitori composed the song "Walkabout long Chinatown", which has been referred to by the government as the unofficial "national song" of the Solomon Islands. Modern Solomon Islander popular music includes various kinds of rock and reggae as well as island music.

Sport

Rugby union: The Solomon Islands national rugby union team has played internationals since 1969. It took part in the Oceania qualifying tournament for the 2003 and 2007 Rugby World Cups, but did not qualify on either occasion.

Association football: The Solomon Islands national football team has proved among the most successful in Oceania and is part of the OFC confederation in FIFA. They are currently ranked 141st out of 210 teams in the FIFA World Rankings. The team became the first team to beat New Zealand in qualifying for a play-off spot against Australia for qualification to the World Cup 2006. They were defeated 7–0 in Australia and 2–1 at home.

Futsal: Closely related to Association Football. On 14 June 2008, the Solomon Islands national futsal team, the Kurukuru, won the Oceania Futsal Championship in Fiji to qualify them for the 2008 FIFA Futsal World Cup, which was held in Brazil from 30 September to 19 October 2008. Solomon Islands is the futsal defending champions in the Oceania region. In 2008 and 2009 the Kurukuru won the Oceania Futsal Championship in Fiji. In 2009 they defeated the host nation Fiji 8–0 to claim the title. The Kurukuru currently hold the world record for the fastest ever goal scored in an official futsal match. It was set by Kurukuru captain Elliot Ragomo, who scored against New Caledonia three seconds into the game in July 2009. They also, however, hold the less enviable record for the worst defeat in the history of the Futsal World Cup, when in 2008 they were beaten by Russia with two goals to thirty-one.

Beach soccer: The Solomon Islands national beach soccer team, the Bilikiki Boys, are statistically the most successful team in Oceania. They have won all three regional championships to date, thereby qualifying on each occasion for the FIFA Beach Soccer World Cup. The Bilikiki Boys are ranked fourteenth in the world , higher than any other team from Oceania.

See also

 Outline of Solomon Islands

Notes

References

External links

 Department of Prime Minister and Cabinet
 Solomon Islands. The World Factbook. Central Intelligence Agency.
 
 Latest Earthquakes – United States Geological Survey
 Solomon Islands Act 1978 (25 May 1978): "to make provision for, and in connection with, the attainment by Solomon Islands of independence within the Commonwealth."

 
1978 establishments in the Solomon Islands
British Western Pacific Territories
Countries in Melanesia
English-speaking countries and territories
Island countries
Least developed countries
Member states of the Commonwealth of Nations
Member states of the United Nations
Small Island Developing States
Solomon Islands (archipelago)
States and territories established in 1978
Volcanic arc islands
Countries in Oceania